D.V.V.S. Varma is the incumbent Working President of the Lok Satta Party for Andhra Pradesh State. He has been actively involved in Lok Satta movement from the time of its inception. He has served in various office-bearer positions for the Lok Satta Party. He is also a reputed newspaper columnist and media analyst of political and policy affairs.

Early life
Mr. Varma lived in Tanuku of West Godavari district along with his wife and two children.

Political Involvement
D.V.V.S. Varma has been an active member of the communist movement in Andhra Pradesh, and the Communist Party of India (CPI), for more than two decades and worked at the grassroots level. After quitting the CPI in the mid '90s, Mr. Varma continued to work in the areas of primary education and sanitation and eventually joined the Lok Satta movement.

Lok Satta Movement
Under the leadership of Mr. Varma, Lok Satta movement expanded its reach into all 23 districts of Andhra Pradesh so much as to have primary units in almost every Mandal of the state. He acted as the State Campaign Coordinator for Andhra Pradesh. The campaign for candidate disclosures led by Mr. Varma culminating with the "People's Ballot" was successful and caught the imagination of the people of the state. He also played a central role in Lok Satta conceiving and leading the hugely successful statewide Movement for Empowerment of Local Governments and the historic '1-crore signature campaign' that brought the issue of empowerment of the third-tier of government (i.e. panchayats and municipalities) to the forefront of public and political debate.

He was also actively involved in coordinating the "Vote India" campaign.

Lok Satta Party
DVVS Varma was chosen as the Party General Secretary in 2006. He was one of the contestants that ran for the President of Lok Satta Party in the first organizational election in January 2009.

Currently, D.V.V.S. Varma is the Working President of Lok Satta Party for Andhra Pradesh State.

Editor
He is also the Chief Editor of Jaateeya Spurthi, a Telugu current affairs fortnightly.
Now, he is the Editor of Lok Satta Times fortnightly (Telugu), the official magazine of Lok Satta Party. Viewers can access this magazine at www.loksatta.org website.

References

External links
 DVVS Varma Blog - Andhra Pradesh Politics
 Mr. Varma explains Lok Satta membership details

Lok Satta Party politicians
Indian magazine editors
Andhra Pradesh politicians
Living people
People from West Godavari district
Indian columnists
Indian political journalists
Journalists from Andhra Pradesh
Indian male journalists
Year of birth missing (living people)